Netherlands competed at the 1998 Winter Paralympics in Nagano, Japan. The team included 3 athletes, 2 men and 1 women. Competitors from Netherlands won 2 medals, including 1 silver and 1 bronze to finish 20th in the medal table.

Medalists

Source: www.paralympic.org & www.olympischstadion.nl

Alpine skiing

 Kjeld Punt
 Martijn Wijsman

Biathlon

 Marjorie van de Bunt

Cross-country skiing

 Marjorie van de Bunt

See also
Netherlands at the Paralympics
Netherlands at the 1998 Winter Olympics

References

External links
International Paralympic Committee official website

Nations at the 1998 Winter Paralympics
1998
Summer Paralympics